Gebirgsjäger are the light infantry part of the alpine or mountain troops (Gebirgstruppe) of Germany, Austria and Switzerland. The word Jäger (meaning "hunter" or "huntsman") is a characteristic term used for light infantry in German speaking countries.

Origins
The mountain infantry of Austria have their roots in the three Landesschützen regiments of the Austro-Hungarian Empire. The mountain infantry of modern Germany carry on certain traditions of the German Alpenkorps (Alpine corps) of World War I. Both countries' mountain infantry share the Edelweiß insignia, established in 1907 as a symbol of the Austro-Hungarian Landesschützen regiments by Emperor Franz Joseph I. These troops wore the edelweiss on the uniform collar. When the Alpenkorps served alongside the Landesschützen on Austria's southern frontier against Italian forces from May 1915, the Landesschützen honoured the men of the Alpenkorps by awarding them their own insignia: the edelweiss.

Gebirgsjäger in World War II

During World War II the Wehrmacht and Waffen-SS raised a number of mountain infantry units, identified by the edelweiss insignia worn on their sleeves and caps.

These divisions were lightly equipped, with much of the transport provided by mules. They were equipped with fewer automatic weapons than regular infantry, however the MG 34 or MG 42 machine gunners were provided with more ammunition than their regular infantry counterparts. Special equipment was made for them including the G33/40 mauser rifle based on the VZ.33 rifle.

Mountain infantry participated in many campaigns, including Operations Weserübung, Silver Fox, Platinum Fox, Arctic Fox and Northern Lights. They also served in the Caucasus, the invasion of Crete, the Balkans, the Gothic Line, and the battles in the Vosges region of France.

Heer (Army) Mountain divisions 
 1st Mountain Division (later 1st Volksgebirgs Division)
 2nd Mountain Division
 3rd Mountain Division
 4th Mountain Division
 5th Mountain Division
 6th Mountain Division
 7th Mountain Division (previously 99th Light Infantry Division)
 8th Mountain Division (previously Division Nr. 157, 157th Reserve Division, 157th Mountain Division)
 9th Mountain Division (previously Shadow Division Steiermark and Division zbV 140)
 188th Mountain Division (previously Division Nr. 188, 188th Reserve Mountain Division)

Waffen SS Mountain divisions 
 6th SS Mountain Division Nord
 7th SS Volunteer Mountain Division Prinz Eugen
 13th Waffen Mountain Division of the SS Handschar (1st Croatian)
 21st Waffen Mountain Division of the SS Skanderbeg (1st Albanian)
 23rd Waffen Mountain Division of the SS Kama (2nd Croatian)
 24th Waffen Mountain Division of the SS Karstjäger

Gebirgsjäger in the modern German forces

Upon the creation of the Bundeswehr in 1956, the mountain infantry returned as a distinctive arm of the West German army. Until 2001, they were organized as the 1. Gebirgsdivision, disbanded as part of Bundeswehr reductions at the end of the cold war. The successor unit is Gebirgsjägerbrigade 23 which has its headquarters in Bad Reichenhall. The battalions of these units are deployed in southern Bavaria, the only high mountain area in Germany touching the Northern Alps. Since 2008 the unit is officially called "Gebirgsjägerbrigade 23 Bayern (Bavaria)" to mark the close relationship between the state and the Gebirgsjäger.

In mid-2020, the official Bundeswehr website stated that the brigade had a strength of approximately 5,300 soldiers.

Traditions
The soldiers of the mountain infantry wear a grey cap (Bergmütze) with an edelweiss on its left side, stem to the front. This distinguishes them from all other German army soldiers who wear berets and the Austrian army, whose edelweiss has its stem to the back. The formal uniform, which is based on traditional alpine mountain climbing trekking outfits (Berganzug), is also different from the standard mainstream German army uniform, and consists of a light-weight grey ski blouse (Skibluse), black Stirrup trousers (Keilhose) or especially during the summer periods "Culottes" knee-breeches (kniebundhose) similar to knickerbockers, and ankle-height mountaineering boots (Bergstiefel) or dual-use mountaineering ski boots.

German Gebirgsjäger traditionally share a very close comradeship and distinct esprit de corps. There is also a special perception of discipline which can for example be seen in a relatively informal relationship between officers and soldiers during normal day duty.

Tasks of the German Gebirgsjäger
The main tasks of the German mountain infantry are:

 Warfare in extreme weather conditions
 Winter warfare
 Warfare in urban terrain
 Warfare in arctic, mountain and desert terrain

23rd Gebirgsjägerbrigade 

The structure of the 23rd Gebirgsjägerbrigade is as of May 2020:

  23rd Gebirgsjäger Brigade (Gebirgsjägerbrigade 23), in Bad Reichenhall
  Staff and Signal Company 23rd Gebirgsjäger Brigade, in Bad Reichenhall
  230th Mountain Reconnaissance Battalion (Gebirgsaufklärungsbataillon 230), in Füssen with Fennek reconnaissance vehicles and KZO drones
  231st Gebirgsjäger Battalion (Gebirgsjägerbataillon 231), in Bad Reichenhall with GTK Boxer armoured personnel carriers
  232nd Gebirgsjäger Battalion (Gebirgsjägerbataillon 232), in Bischofswiesen with Bv206S
  233rd Gebirgsjäger Battalion (Gebirgsjägerbataillon 233), in Mittenwald with Bv206S
  8th Mountain Engineer Battalion (Gebirgspionierbataillon 8), in Ingolstadt
  8th Mountain Supply Battalion (Gebirgsversorgungsbataillon 8), in Füssen
  230th Mountain Pack Animal Operations and Training Center (Einsatz- und Ausbildungszentrum für Gebirgstragtierwesen 230), in Bad Reichenhall

Mountain units which are not part of the Gebirgsjägerbrigade 23:
  Mountain and Winter Combat Training Base (Ausbildungsstützpunkt Gebirgs- und Winterkampf), in Mittenwald

As the Gebirgsjägerbrigade 23 is part of the so-called stabilisation forces (Stabilisierungskräfte), it lacks any accompanying artillery. Mortar support is provided by the Schwere Jägerkompanie (heavy infantry company) in every mountain infantry battalion.

Equipment and organization

A mountain infantry battalion consists of about 900 soldiers in five companies. One company is responsible for staff and support duties and has a "Hochgebirgsjägerzug" (special platoon for high mountain fight and reconnaissance) at its disposal. Three companies are consisting of classical mountain infantry, another one is a heavy company which is equipped with the Wiesel AWC for mortar support, tank defence and supporting cannon fire with 20 mm guns. Two of the three mountain infantry battalions are equipped with the Hägglund 206S, one with the GTK Boxer.

 Equipment of the Gebirgsjäger (selection):
 Wiesel AWC
 Bandvagn 206
 Snowmobiles
 Military versions of the Unimog

Gebirgsjäger in the modern Austrian forces
Today the traditions of the Austrian mountain infantry are maintained by the 6th Gebirgsbrigade in western Austria

Units
List of active mountain infantry in the Austrian Armed Forces :
 6th Gebirgsbrigade
 Brigadekommando (HQ) in Absam
 Stabsbataillon 6 (HQ battalion) in Innsbruck
 Jägerbataillon 23 (Mountain infantry battalion) in Bludesch
 Jägerbataillon 24 (Mountain infantry battalion) in Lienz
 Jägerbataillon 26 (Mountain infantry battalion) in Spittal
 Pionierbataillon 2 (Combat engineer battalion) in Salzburg

Gebirgs troops in the modern Swiss forces
Specially trained Swiss mountain troops have been a part of the Swiss Army since 1892 when the 3rd Army Corps was established. A central mountain combat school was opened in Andermatt in 1967.

Notable members
Also see Alpenkorps for the World War I era unit.
 Karl-Theodor zu Guttenberg—German politician
 Hubert Lanz--General der Gebirgstruppe during World War II
 Prince Ludwig of Bavaria
 Edmund Stoiber—German politician
 August Winter--General der Gebirgstruppe during World War II

See also

 List of mountain warfare forces
General der Gebirgstruppe
Imperial-Royal Mountain Troops (Austria-Hungary)
Jäger (infantry) 
Mountain Guide Badge

Similar units
 Argentina: Cazadores de Montaña (Argentine Army)
 France: Chasseurs Alpins
 Italy: Alpini
 Poland: Podhale rifles
 Romania: Vânători de munte
 Sweden: Bergsjägare, part of the Norrland Dragoon Regiment
 United States:
 10th Mountain Division
 172nd Infantry Regiment
 1st Battalion (Mountain), 157th Infantry Regiment, Colorado Army National Guard
 Great Britain
 Royal Marines Commandos. Great Britain's Mountain & Arctic Warfare specialists

References

External links
 Lone Sentry: Some Notes on German Mountain Warfare (US WWII ...
 Articles, Pictures, Videostreams, Links (in German) about the Gebirgsjaeger
 Extensive web site dedicated to the history of Gebirgstruppen
 Waffen-SS mountain brigades and divisions - Origins, development and deployment (1942-1945)
 Informational Video from BWTV

Military history of Germany during World War II
German Mountain Troops
Mountain troops
Army reconnaissance units and formations